Sara Mattei (born 28 April 1995), known professionally as Mara Sattei, is an Italian singer-songwriter.

Biography 
Mattei was born in Fiumicino as the older sister of Italian singer and record producer Tha Supreme. Her music career began in 2009, when she started uploading covers of various songs to YouTube. In 2013, she took part in the thirteenth season of the Italian talent show Amici di Maria De Filippi reaching the final stage of the show before being eliminated on the second Live show. After the show, she released her debut EP Frammenti: Acoustic Covers N.1.

After a few years of inactivity, in which she moved to London, in 2019 she resumed her musical career under the pseudonym Mara Sattei, obtained by interchanging the initials of her first and last name. Her first releases under the pseudonym "Nuova registrazione 326", "Nuova registrazione 402" and "Nuova registrazione 527" were produced by her brother Tha Supreme and achieved a fair amount of success in Italy. "Nuova registrazione 326" in particular has been certified gold and can thus be marked as her breakthrough release.

In 2020, her and Tha Supreme collaborated with Congolese-Belgian singer Lous and the Yakuza on a remix of the single "Dilemme". In the same year, she appeared on the single released the single "Spigoli" Tha Supreme and Carl Brave. The two songs reached positions 3 and 1 on the Classifica FIMI Artisti respectively and were certified platinum, marking another success in her career.

On January 14, 2022 she released her first studio album Universo, with the extracted singles "Ciò che non dici" and "Parentesi", the latter in collaboration with Italian singer Giorgia. The album charted on seventh place on the Classifica FIMI Artisti, and was promoted through the Universo Tour 2022. In the summer of that year, Sattei also collaborated with Fedez and Tananai on 
the song "La dolce vita", which reached position 1 on the Classifica FIMI Artisti. The song was certified gold in Switzerland and triple platinum in Italy.

On 4 December 2022, Mara Sattei's participation in the Sanremo Music Festival 2023 was officially announced. Her entry is titled "Duemileminuti" and is the result of collaboration with Maneskin's Damiano David and Tha Supreme.

She considers herself Catholic.

Discography

Studio albums

Extended plays

Singles

As lead artist

As featured artist

Guest appearances

Television

Tournées 
 2022 – Universo Tour 2022

References 

Italian pop musicians
Italian women singer-songwriters
1995 births
Living people
People from Fiumicino
Italian Roman Catholics